Crèvecœur or Creve Coeur may refer to:

 A French term for broken heart
 Crèvecœur chicken, a French poultry breed
 Creve Coeur, Illinois, a village near Peoria, Illinois on the Illinois River in Tazewell County
 Fort Crevecoeur, a former French fort near present-day Creve Coeur, Illinois
 Creve Coeur, Missouri, a suburb of St. Louis, Missouri
 Crèvecoeur (film), a 1955 documentary film
 Fort Crevecoeur, Dutch slave fort erected in Accra, Ghana in 1649, renamed to Ussher Fort after it came under British control
 Creve Coeur, Mauritius

French communes 
 Crèvecœur-en-Auge, in the Calvados department
 Crèvecœur-en-Brie, in the Seine-et-Marne department
 Crèvecœur-sur-l'Escaut, in the Nord department
 Crèvecœur-le-Petit, in the Oise department
 Crèvecœur-le-Grand, in the Oise department

People with the surname 
 J. Hector St. John de Crèvecœur (1735–1813), French-American writer
 Jacques Boucher de Crèvecœur de Perthes (1788–1868), French geologist
 Pascaline Crêvecoeur (born 1982), Belgian-French actress
 Philippe de Crèvecœur d'Esquerdes (1418–1494), French military commander